Safe at Home! is a 1962 American comedy sports film starring Major League Baseball players Mickey Mantle and Roger Maris of the New York Yankees. The film also stars William Frawley (in his final film appearance) and Don Collier, with appearances by Yankees Whitey Ford and Ralph Houk.

The film concerns a Florida boy who lies to his Little League teammates, telling them that he knows Mantle and Maris and will bring them to their team banquet. His attempts to meet his heroes during spring training by sneaking into the stadium and the players' hotel room result in chaos. The film was shot in Fort Lauderdale and Pompano Beach, Florida.

Plot

Cast
Mickey Mantle as himself
Roger Maris as himself
William Frawley as Bill Turner
Patricia Barry as Johanna Price
Don Collier as Ken Lawton
Eugene Iglesias as Mr. Torres
Flip Mark as Henry
Bryan Russell as Hutch Lawton
Scott Lane as Mike Torres
Charles G. Martin as Henry's Father
Ralph Houk as himself
Whitey Ford as himself

See also
 List of American films of 1962

References

External links
 
 

1962 films
American baseball films
American sports comedy films
American black-and-white films
Columbia Pictures films
Films directed by Walter Doniger
Films set in Florida
Films shot in Florida
Films about the New York Yankees
1960s sports comedy films
1962 comedy films
1960s English-language films
1960s American films